Walter Arthur Stohlberg was a Canadian tennis player of the 1940s and 1950s.

Stohlberg, a graduate of Kitsilano High School in Vancouver, served as a Bombardier with the Royal Canadian Air Force during World War II. He became a German prisoner of war in 1944 and was held at Stalag Luft III.

Post war, Stohlberg was a Canadian Davis Cup representative twice, featuring in ties against Mexico in 1948 and Australia in 1949. He was a doubles runner-up at the 1949 Canadian Championships, with Lorne Main. In 1952 he had to retire from amateur tennis in order to accept a paid coaching position.

See also
List of Canada Davis Cup team representatives

References

External links
 
 

Year of birth missing
1977 deaths
Canadian male tennis players
Sportspeople from Vancouver
Racket sportspeople from British Columbia
Royal Canadian Air Force personnel of World War II
Canadian prisoners of war in World War II
World War II prisoners of war held by Germany